Aljunied MRT station is an above-ground Mass Rapid Transit (MRT) station on the East West line (EWL) in Geylang, Singapore. Named after Aljunied Road, this station primarily serves Aljunied, one of the subzones that make up Geylang planning area. On the EWL, it is between the Paya Lebar and Kallang stations.

The station opened on 4 November 1989 as part of the MRT eastern line extension to Tanah Merah station. The station exterior has the characteristic dome-shaped segmented roof also seen on other elevated EWL stations.

History

The contract for the construction of Aljunied station and associated viaducts was awarded to Lee Kim Tah Ltd at a contract sum of S$59.52 million in November 1985. The contractor had partnered with a French company Societe Generale D'Enterprises Sainrapt Et Brice (SGE) for the construction. The contract also includes the construction of the Kallang and Paya Lebar stations. The station opened earlier than expected on 4 November 1989.

On 26 June 2009, train services along the East West line were disrupted for almost 18 minutes at about 7:25pm after a man jumped off the platform and ran towards Paya Lebar station. However, SMRT staff did not manage to find the man. The Chinese man in his 40s found his way down the tracks to the street but was later arrested by the police. He sustained leg injuries and was charged with attempted suicide.

As part of efforts to improve overall accessibility of public transport, the overhead pedestrian bridge near Aljunied and other stations (Sengkang, Bishan, Khatib, Kranji and Yew Tee) have lifts installed to improve barrier free accessibility to major transport nodes. The lifts were installed progressively, from the first quarter of 2013, with all completed by end 2013. Aljunied station was also the first batch of ten stations to have additional bicycle parking facilities under a National Cycling Plan announced in 2010.

Half height platform screen doors started operations on 11 February 2011, and this station was installed with high-volume low-speed fans, which began operating on 27 July 2012. This station was upgraded with TITAN faregates on 30 November 2013.

Station details

Services
The station serves the EWL between the Paya Lebar and Kallang stations. The station operates between 5:48am (6.14am on Sundays and Public Holidays) and 12:20am.

In 2018, Aljunied was the temporary terminus for train services from Joo Koon station during the early closures, late openings and full closures of the line, from 5 January to 4 February.

Design
Like most EWL elevated stations on the eastern segment on the line (after Kallang station), Aljunied station has the notable feature of the dome-shaped roof, segmented like a caterpillar, over the platform level. The design was an attempt by the MRT Corporation (MRTC) to give the stations on the EWL an "attractive look".

Notes and references

Notes

References

External links

 

Railway stations in Singapore opened in 1989
Geylang
Mass Rapid Transit (Singapore) stations